Edward John Holt MBE (29 September 1867 – 6 November 1948) was Dean of Trinidad from 1914 to 1947.

Holt was born into an ecclesiastical family in Grantham and educated at St Augustine's College, Canterbury. He was ordained in 1890 and served curacies in the Windward Islands and Port of Spain before coming to Trinidad's Cathedral
in 1895.

Notes

People from Grantham
1867 births
Deans of Trinidad
1948 deaths
Members of the Order of the British Empire
Alumni of St Augustine's College, Canterbury